Nova Crvenka is a village in Serbia. It is situated in the Kula municipality, in the West Bačka District, Vojvodina province. The village has a Serb ethnic majority and its population numbering 420 people (2011 census).

Historical population

̽̽Nova Crvenka was at the time listed as a part of ethnically German populated Crvenka, estimation is based on number of Orthodox Christians in overall Crvenka population

People
Dušan Salatić (born 1929), professor and writer.

See also
List of places in Serbia
List of cities, towns and villages in Vojvodina

References

Slobodan Ćurčić, Broj stanovnika Vojvodine, Novi Sad, 1996.

External links
“A Home for Town Planning Kula-Odzaci” Kula

Places in Bačka
West Bačka District
Kula, Serbia